Christiansfeld Pharmacy (Danish: Christiansfeld Apotek) was established in 1785 in Christiansfeld, Denmark. Its building at Lindegade 21 was in 1945 listed in the Danish registry of protected buildings and places.

History
The pharmacy was established in 1785 and was until 1835 owned by Brødremenigheden.

Building
The building is from 1783 but the dormer was added in circa 1940. The pharmacy was in 1946 acquired by Karen Johanne Rømer (born 1894).

List of owners
List of owners:
 xx.xx.1785 - xx.xx.1793 Jacob Heinrich Krohn
 xx.xx.1793 - 31.12.1837 Abraham Gottlieb Padel
 01.01.1838 - 31.12.1868 Abraham Friederich Padel
 01.01.1869 - 31.12.1909 Carl Theodor Abraham Padel
 01.01.1910 - 31.05.1921 Wilfred Theodor Padel
 01.06.1921 - 10.12.1937 Hans Amatus Theodor Christian Lind
 Indehavere:
 29.11.1937 - 30.04.1946 Hans Amatus Theodor Christian Lind
 04.01.1946 - 15.10.1954 Karen Johanne Rømer
Ø 15.09.1954 - 31.01.1973 Sigrid Johanne Hald
 25.10.1972 - 31.01.1987 Finn Ohlsen
 07.01.1987 -               Ingrid Frees Christensen

References

Exyrtnal links
 Official website

Pharmacies of Denmark
Listed buildings and structures in Kolding Municipality
Listed pharmacy buildings in Denmark
Danish companies established in 1785